Thenimali is a panchayat town in Indian state of Tamil Nadu. It is a suburb of Thiruvannamalai UA.

demographics
Thenimalai having population of over 12000 providing sub urban to Tiruvannamalai urbanity. it comes under Tiruvannamalai urban agglomerations on salem ( via:thandarampet & harur) road SH 9,there is one railway station for Palayam as "THENIMALAI" at up coming route of tiruvannamalai-thandaramapttu-chengam-singarapet-uthangarai-samalpatti-bargur-vepannahalli-bangalore (k.r.puram).railway route.

References

External links

Cities and towns in Tiruvannamalai district